The Bentley S2 is a luxury car produced by Bentley from 1959 until 1962. The successor to the S1, it featured the new Rolls-Royce–Bentley L-series V8 engine and improved air conditioning made possible by that engine's increased output. Power steering was also standard, and a new dashboard and steering wheel were introduced. Some early S2s were built with the earlier S1 dashboard.

A high-performance S2-derived Continental edition was also produced.

1,863 standard and 57 long-wheelbase S2 car chassis were built between 1959 and 1962. Almost all were fitted with standard factory bodywork. A number had coachbuilt bodies by Park Ward, Hooper, H. J. Mulliner & Co., and James Young.

S2
Announced at the beginning of October 1959 the S2 replaced the S1's straight-six engine with the new aluminium Rolls-Royce - Bentley L Series V8 shared with the Rolls-Royce Silver Cloud II.  It displaced 6.2 L (6230 cc, or 380 cu in), and offered significantly improved performance.

As advertised in The Times, Friday, 2 October 1959:

Of the 1,863 standard S2 models produced, 15 had H. J. Mulliner & Co. drophead coupe bodies. Of the 57 long-wheelbase cars, five had James Young bodies and one a Mercedes-Bentley yachting station-wagon body by Wendler.

S2 Continental
An "S2 Continental" chassis was built with higher performance engines and higher gearing for lighter bodywork. 388 were built, bodied by the same group of coachbuilders as the standard S2.

Gallery

References

S2
Bentley S2
Luxury vehicles
Convertibles
Sedans
Cars introduced in 1959